La Madelaine-sous-Montreuil (literally La Madelaine under Montreuil) is a commune in the Pas-de-Calais department in the Hauts-de-France region of France.

Geography
La Madelaine-sous-Montreuil is situated adjacent to the northwest of Montreuil-sur-Mer on the D139 road and by the banks of the Canche river.

Population

See also
Communes of the Pas-de-Calais department

References

Madelainesousmontreuil